"Lock, stock, and barrel" is a merism used predominantly in the United Kingdom and North America, meaning "all", "total" or "everything". It derives from the effective portions of a gun: the lock, the stock, and the barrel.

History
The term was first recorded in the letters of Sir Walter Scott in 1817, in the line "Like the High-landman's gun, she wants stock, lock, and barrel, to put her into repair." It is, however, thought that this term evolved into a popular saying some years before in England.

Common uses

Media
Lock Stock & Barrel is a book dealing with the restoration and repair of antique firearms, in two volumes.

"Lock, stock, and barrel" is also referenced in the title of the British crime film Lock, Stock and Two Smoking Barrels (1998), as well as in the TV film Lock, Stock and Barrel (1971).

Officer Lockstock and Officer Barrel are two characters from Urinetown: the Musical. Another musical that used it was the animated musical The Nightmare Before Christmas by Tim Burton featured three infamous children, the 'Trick or Treaters' 'Lock', 'Shock' and 'Barrel'.

The phrase was mentioned by Christopher Lloyd in the 1988 movie Who Framed Roger Rabbit.

The phrase was mentioned by Frank Costanza in the Seinfeld episode "The Shower Head" (season 7, episode 16).

The phrase was spoken by the character Leonardo Leonardo in Clerks: The Animated Series (season 1, episode 1).

Politics
Politician Mike Pence, Vice President of the United States under Donald Trump, has heavily favored the phrase since at least 2010 when urging for the repeal of Obamacare, and used the phrase extensively during and after the 2016 presidential campaign.

Music
"Lock, Stock and Barrel" is a foxtrot written by Sammy Fain.

Joe Loss and his orchestra recorded a version in London in 1950. It was released by EMI on the His Master's Voice label as catalogue numbers BD 6070 and HE 2832.

Poetry
The term is used by W.B. Yeats in his poem "The Tower".

See also
 Hook, line and sinker
 Siamese twins (linguistics)

References

Figures of speech